Marakami (also Romanized as Mārākamī; also known as Mārākūmī) is a village in Qaleh Darrehsi Rural District, in the Central District of Maku County, West Azerbaijan Province, Iran. At the 2006 census, its population was 175, in 34 families.

References 

Populated places in Maku County